Sailing competition has been in the Universiade in 1999, 2005, 2011 and in 2019 as optional sport.

Equipment

Legend: M – Men; W – Women; Mx – Mixed;

Results

Men

Sailboard

Laser

470

Women

Sailboard

Europe

Laser Radial

470

Mixed

Team

470

Laser Radial

Techno 293

RS21

Medal table 
Last updated after the 2019 Summer Universiade.

References

External links 
 World Sailing